Patryk Krzysztof Misik (born November 13, 1994) is a Canadian soccer player who plays for New Zealand club Napier City Rovers.

Club career

Youth
Misik came up through the Toronto youth scene, spending time with the Toronto Lynx and Brantford Galaxy, before moving to Poland to play with Śląsk Wrocław.

Ottawa Fury
After spending the majority of his time with Śląsk Wrocław's reserve team, Misik returned to Canada and signed with NASL club Ottawa Fury FC on February 6, 2015. He made his debut for Ottawa in their season opener against the Carolina RailHawks on April 4. On June 23, 2015 the club announced it would not extend Misik's contract beyond the Spring season.

Raków Częstochowa
Four days after being released by Ottawa Misik signed with Polish club Raków Częstochowa in the II liga.

Órdenes
In August 2016, Misik signed with Spanish club SD Órdenes in the Tercera División. At the end of the 2016–17 season, Órdenes was relegated to the fifth division and Misik left the club after his contract expired.

Napier City Rovers
Misik subsequently signed with New Zealand side Napier City Rovers in the Central Premier League ahead of their 2018 season. He scored a brace in his debut on 1 April in a 7–3 win over Waterside Karori.

Eastern Suburbs
Ahead of the 2018–19 season, Misik signed with New Zealand Football Championship side Eastern Suburbs AFC. He made one appearance for Eastern Suburbs at the start of that season before departing the club.

Second spell at Napier City
Misik returned to Napier City Rovers ahead of the 2019 season. On May 11, Misik scored a goal in Napier City's 4–2 win over Palmerston North Marist in the first round of the Chatham Cup.

International career
Misik is eligible to represent Canada by birth, as well as Poland due to his Polish-born parents.

In 2012, Misik accepted his first Canadian youth national team call-up for a Canada U-20 camp in November 2012. He then went on to represent Canada at the 2013 Jeux de la Francophonie. In 2017, he participated in his first Canada U-23 camp at the 2017 Aspire U-23 tournament in Qatar.

Honours
Ottawa Fury
North American Soccer League Fall season: 2015

Napier City Rovers
Central Premier League: 2018
Chatham Cup: 2019

References

External links

1994 births
Living people
Association football midfielders
Canadian soccer players
Soccer people from Ontario
Sportspeople from Brantford
Canadian people of Polish descent
Canadian expatriate soccer players
Expatriate footballers in Poland
Canadian expatriate sportspeople in Poland
Expatriate footballers in Spain
Canadian expatriate sportspeople in Spain
Expatriate association footballers in New Zealand
Canadian expatriate sportspeople in New Zealand
Toronto Lynx players
Brantford Galaxy players
Śląsk Wrocław players
Ottawa Fury FC players
Raków Częstochowa players
Napier City Rovers FC players
Eastern Suburbs AFC players
Canadian Soccer League (1998–present) players
North American Soccer League players
Tercera División players
New Zealand Football Championship players
Canada men's youth international soccer players